Events in the year 2011 in Monaco.

Incumbents 
 Sovereign Prince: Albert II
 Minister of State: Michel Roger

Events 

 26-29 May - Circuit de Monaco, Round 6 of the 2011 FIA Formula 1 World Championship was won by Sebastian Vettel, he was driving the Red Bull-Renault RB7 and finshed 78 laps in 2:09:38.373 

 1–2 July – The Wedding of Albert II, Prince of Monaco, and Charlene Wittstock

Deaths 
 18 March – Princess Antoinette of Monaco died, age 90.

See also 

 2011 in Europe
 City states

References 

 
Years of the 21st century in Monaco
2010s in Monaco
Monaco
Monaco